The South African Railways Class 8Z 2-8-0 of 1904 was a steam locomotive from the pre-Union era in the Cape of Good Hope.

In 1904, the Cape Government Railways placed its last eight 8th Class 2-8-0 Consolidation type steam locomotives in service. Most of its other 8th Class locomotives were built with a  Mastodon type wheel arrangement. In 1912, when they were assimilated into the South African Railways, these eight were renumbered and designated Class 8Z.

Manufacturer

The first locomotive in the Cape Government Railways (CGR)  Consolidation type 8th Class, later to become the South African Railways (SAR) Class 8X, was designed by H.M. Beatty, the CGR's Chief Locomotive Superintendent from 1896 to 1910.

In 1904, a third batch of eight of these locomotives was delivered from the North British Locomotive Company of Glasgow, Scotland. All eight were allocated to the Western System of the CGR, numbered in the range from 821 to 828.

Characteristics
These locomotives were very similar to the previous four Kitson-built Consolidations, but slightly larger in boiler and firegrate area dimensions. They also used saturated steam and cylinders with overhead slide valves, actuated by inside Stephenson valve gear. Of the three models of Type XE1 tender which were in use at the time, these locomotives were equipped with the version which had the  coal capacity.

Class 8 sub-classes
When the Union of South Africa was established on 31 May 1910, the three Colonial government railways (CGR, Natal Government Railways and Central South African Railways) were united under a single administration to control and administer the railways, ports and harbours of the Union. Even though the South African Railways and Harbours came into existence in 1910, the actual classification and renumbering of all the rolling stock of the three constituent railways were only implemented with effect from 1 January 1912.

In 1912, these locomotives were designated Class 8Z on the South African Railways (SAR) and renumbered in the range from 900 to 907.

In spite of the difference in wheel arrangement, the CGR grouped its  Consolidation and post-7th Class  Mastodon locomotives together as the 8th Class. The  locomotives became SAR Classes 8 and 8A to 8F and the  locomotives became Classes 8X to 8Z.

Service
In SAR service, the Class 8Z was used mainly in the Western Cape, shedded at Touws River. A few later ended up at Bloemfontein in the Orange Free State and Klerksdorp in Transvaal. They were withdrawn by 1935.

Illustration
The main picture shows no. 804 at Touws River, c. 1930.

References

1620
1620
2-8-0 locomotives
1D locomotives
NBL locomotives
Cape gauge railway locomotives
Railway locomotives introduced in 1904
1904 in South Africa
Scrapped locomotives